Fort Ridgely State Park  is a state park of Minnesota, USA, on the Minnesota River south of Fairfax. It preserves Fort Ridgely, site of the Battle of Fort Ridgely during the Dakota War of 1862.  It was the only Minnesota state park with a 9-hole golf course, which overlooks the Minnesota River and goes along Fort Ridgely Creek.

The park was established in 1911. The Civilian Conservation Corps Rustic Style buildings within the state park, built between 1934 and 1936, are listed on the National Register of Historic Places.

In September 2016, the golf course was closed due to declining revenue. A group of local residents launched a campaign hoping to raise enough money to lease the course from the Minnesota Department of Natural Resources (DNR) and re-open it. However the group failed to win the support of the Fairfax City Council. The DNR plans to plow the course under and restore it to native prairie.

References

External links

 Fort Ridgely State Park

1911 establishments in Minnesota
Battlefields of the wars between the United States and Native Americans
Buildings and structures completed in 1936
Civilian Conservation Corps in Minnesota
Park buildings and structures on the National Register of Historic Places in Minnesota
Protected areas established in 1911
Protected areas of Nicollet County, Minnesota
Protected areas of Renville County, Minnesota
Rustic architecture in Minnesota
State parks of Minnesota
Historic districts on the National Register of Historic Places in Minnesota
National Register of Historic Places in Renville County, Minnesota